Menestho truncatula is a species of sea snail, a marine gastropod mollusk in the family Pyramidellidae, the pyrams and their allies.

Description
The shell size varies between 2.5 mm and 3.5 mm.

Distribution
This species occurs in the following locations:
 European waters (ERMS scope) (Barents Sea - Chuckchi Sea)
 United Kingdom Exclusive Economic Zone

References

External links
 To Biodiversity Heritage Library (1 publication)
 To CLEMAM
 To Encyclopedia of Life
 To World Register of Marine Species
 

Pyramidellidae
Gastropods described in 1915